UGL Rail is an Australian rail company specialising in building, maintaining and refurbishing diesel locomotives, diesel and electric multiple units and freight wagons. It is a subsidiary of UGL Limited and is based in Melbourne, with a staff of 1,200 across Australia and Asia. It operates factories in Broadmeadow, Maintrain Auburn, Spotswood and Bassendean. While it used to operate a factory in Taree, the plant was shut down and the equipment sold off.

History

Founded in Australia in 1899 by Cornish brothers Alfred and Ralph Goninan as an engineering and manufacturing company for the coal industry, A Goninan & Co Limited was incorporated as a public company in 1905.

It entered the rail business in 1917 via Commonwealth Steel Products Company of Waratah, Newcastle, a wheel and axle manufacturer, because those items could no longer be imported from Belgium due to World War I. A Goninan & Co moved to more convenient freehold land at Broadmeadow in 1919 and built a flourishing business in general engineering. It made pitheads, boilers, wagons and a huge, cast 41-ton block for the district's coal trade. In October 1964, A Goninan & Co was purchased by Howard Smith.

In August 1999, A Goninan & Co was sold to United Group and re-branded United Goninan. In 2005, it was renamed United Group Rail, as part of a reorganisation following United Group's purchase of Alstom's Australian subsidiary, Alstom Transport Australia and New Zealand.

Factories
While most items were manufactured at Broadmeadow, it did purchase Comeng's Bassendean, Western Australia plant. This plant rebuilt many Pilbara Alco locomotives with General Electric components in the 1990s as well as building 17 Westrail P class and 60 NR class locomotives.

In 1983, a factory was established in Townsville to fulfill a contract for Queensland Railways 2600 class locomotives that required them to be built locally. It later built the 2800 class.

Products

National
14 Australian National EL class diesel locomotives
120 National Rail NR class diesel locomotives
137 C44aci diesel locomotives

New South Wales
6 New South Wales 43 class diesel locomotives
20 New South Wales 47 class diesel locomotives
5 stainless steel power vans
150 S set EMU carriages
160 K set EMU carriages
56 C set EMU carriages
455 Tangara EMU carriages
196 Oscar EMU carriages
14 Hunter Railcar DMU carriages
12 QR National 5000 class diesel locomotives 
19 QR National 5020 class diesel locomotives

Victoria
4 4D EMU carriages
22 V/Line Sprinter DMU carriages

Queensland
3 Queensland Railways 1150 class diesel locomotives
13 Queensland Rail 2600 class diesel locomotives
50 Queensland Rail 2800 class diesel locomotives
3 UGL Rail PH37ACmai diesel locomotives

Western Australia
20 Western Australia ADL/ADC class DMU carriages
17 Westrail P class diesel locomotives
9 Prospector/Avonlink DMU carriages
3 GE C36-7 diesel Locomotive, built in 1978 for Hamersley & Robe River railway

Hong Kong
Refurbishment of 762 MTR Metro Cammell M-stock carriages for MTR
Hong Kong Light Rail 20 Phase 3 LRV
UGL and CSR Corporation Limited Hong Kong Light Rail 22 Phase 4 LRV (Design)

New South Wales

Sydney Metro
UGL is a part of Metro Trains Sydney which constructed and now operates the Sydney Metro Northwest

New Intercity Fleet
UGL is a member of the RailConnect NSW consortium, a joint venture between UGL, Hyundai Rotem and Mitsubishi Electric, which has designed and will build and maintain more than 500 NSW TrainLink D set train carriages. Delivery commenced in the second half of 2019. Maintenance will be carried out at the Kangy Angy Maintenance Centre.

UGL Unipart
UGL Rail has been responsible for the maintenance of all of CityRail's EMU fleet at Maintrain, Auburn since March 1994 following the closure of Electric Carriage Workshops and Eveleigh Carriage Workshops. In the early 1990s A Goninan & Co refurbished S and V sets at Broadmeadow as part of the Citydecker program.

Since December 2011 UGL Unipart, a 70:30 joint venture with Unipart, has maintained most of CityRail and later Sydney Trains and NSW TrainLink's EMU fleet.

Maintenance on H sets was initially carried out at Eveleigh but from 2018 is done at other depots with major work done at Maintrain, Auburn as for other types of Sydney Trains sets. The contract to maintain 1,050 Sydney Trains carriages including H and V sets was extended for two years from 1 July 2019.

Country Regional Network
UGL Rail has been responsible for maintaining the NSW Country Regional Network since January 2022.

Metro Trains Melbourne
UGL Rail owns 20% of Metro Trains Melbourne, the consortium that has run Melbourne's metro railway network since November 2009.

Adelaide
In July 2020, UGL Rail became responsible for maintenance of the Glenelg tram line in Adelaide as part of the Torrens Connect consortium.

References

External links
Company website
RailPower partners with 'Premier' Australian Railway Engineers United Goninan to market hybrid locomotives in Australia and SE Asia
Alfred Goninan

Locomotive manufacturers of Australia
Rolling stock manufacturers of Australia
Vehicle manufacturing companies established in 1899
Australian companies established in 1899
Alstom
Manufacturing companies based in Melbourne